Torquigener andersonae, commonly known as Anderson's toadfish, is a species of fish in the family Tetraodontidae. It is found in the coastal waters of southeastern Australia. It was described by Graham Hardy in 1983, who named it for a colleague at the University of New South Wales, Dr Jennifer M.E.Anderson. It has been recorded from Jervis Bay and Bermagui on the southern New South Wales coast.

References

External links
 Fishes of Australia : Torquigener andersonae

Anderson's toadfish
Fauna of New South Wales
Anderson's toadfish